The following is a partial list of forts in Gujarat, India

See also
 List of forts in India

References

Gujarat
Forts in Gujarat
forts